Olivella exilis is a species of small sea snail, marine gastropod mollusk in the subfamily Olivellinae, in the family Olividae, the olives.  Species in the genus Olivella are commonly called dwarf olives.

The taxonomic status of this species is uncertain.

Description
The length of this species attains 10 mm.

Distribution
This marine species occurs off the Bahamas; the Greater Antilles Guadeloupe and off Southeastern Florida, USA.

References

 Jensen, R. H. (1997). A Checklist and Bibliography of the Marine Molluscs of Bermuda. Unp. , 547 pp
Returning to the roots: morphology, molecular phylogeny and classification of the Olivoidea (Gastropoda: Neogastropoda). Zoological Journal of the Linnean Society 180: 493-541

exilis
Gastropods described in 1871